The Sakhalin leaf warbler (Phylloscopus borealoides) is a species of Old World warbler in the family Phylloscopidae.
It is found in Sakhalin, the Kuril Islands and Japan; it winters to the Amami and Okinawa islands.

Its natural habitat is temperate forests.

References

Sakhalin leaf warbler
Birds of North Asia
Birds of Japan
Sakhalin leaf warbler
Taxonomy articles created by Polbot